The Cache River is a tributary of the White River, 213 mi (343 km) long, in northeastern Arkansas in the United States.  Its headwaters also drain a small portion of southeastern Missouri.  Via the White River, the Cache is part of the Mississippi River watershed, placing the river and surrounding watershed in the Arkansas Delta.

Ecology
The river supports 53 mammalian species, over 200 bird species, and nearly 50 species of reptiles and amphibians. The refuge is also the most important wintering area for mallard ducks and other migratory waterfowl on the continent. As a result, low-lying areas in the vicinity of the river's lower course are a popular destination for duck hunters. This is also where the ivory-billed woodpecker was recently speculated to have been sighted (after it was believed to be extinct for 60 years). The watershed also contains the largest remaining tract of contiguous bottomland hardwood forest found in North America. Because of these combination of these unique features, the Cache River National Wildlife Refuge was created along approximately  along the river's lower reaches this location was also used by team trees to plant 20 million trees.

Hydrology
The Cache is formed by a confluence of agricultural ditches in Butler County, Missouri and soon enters Arkansas, flowing generally south-southwestwardly.  Several portions of the river's upper course have been straightened and channelized.  It joins the White River at the town of Clarendon, Arkansas.

The river is a slow muddy river with meandering channels, sloughs, swampy areas, and oxbow lakes.

History
During the American Civil War, the Battle of Cotton Plant was fought along the Cache River at the town of Cotton Plant.

Etymology
The name of the river is probably a Picardie word meaning "hunt" as a reference to the abundant wildlife along the river. The first explorer into the area was Father Marquette, for whom Picard was the native tongue.

Gallery

See also
List of Arkansas rivers
List of Missouri rivers

References

Rivers of Arkansas
Rivers of Missouri
Tributaries of the White River (Arkansas–Missouri)
Bodies of water of Clay County, Arkansas
Bodies of water of Greene County, Arkansas
Bodies of water of Craighead County, Arkansas
Bodies of water of Jackson County, Arkansas
Bodies of water of Woodruff County, Arkansas
Bodies of water of Monroe County, Arkansas
Bodies of water of Prairie County, Arkansas
Ramsar sites in the United States